Ernest Edward Payne (29 April 1934 – 18 March 2010) was an  Australian rules footballer who played with South Melbourne in the Victorian Football League (VFL).

Notes

External links 

1934 births
2010 deaths
Australian rules footballers from Victoria (Australia)
Sydney Swans players